A Tale Etched in Blood and Hard Black Pencil is the tenth novel by Christopher Brookmyre.

Awards
It has been long-listed for the 2008 Theakston's Old Peculier Crime Novel of the Year Award.

External links
Grim and Bear it, The Guardian review.

2006 British novels
Novels by Christopher Brookmyre
Little, Brown and Company books